Fitness Boxing is an exergaming video game developed by Imagineer for the Nintendo Switch. The game was released on December 20, 2018 in Japan by Imagineer, December 21, 2018 in PAL territories and January 4, 2019 in North America by Nintendo.

Fitness Boxing is the successor to the Shape Boxing trilogy released on the Wii, with the first two installments rebranded as licensed Gold's Gym fitness games in at least North America.

A sequel, Fitness Boxing 2: Rhythm and Exercise, released for Nintendo Switch on December 4, 2020.

A spin-off sequel, Fitness Boxing Fist of the North Star, was announced at a Nintendo Direct on September 13, 2022, and will release in March 2023. It is the only game in the series to not be published by Nintendo worldwide.

Gameplay
The gameplay involves using the Joy-Con motion controllers to perform punches and dodging maneuvers. The workouts recommend a full body stretching exercise both at the start and end of the workouts. The difficulty and complexity of the workouts increase gradually over time. Free exercises are always available, regardless of if daily workout has been completed or not. The score for each exercise (excluding the stretches) is determined by how precise the player is in performing their punches and maneuvers.

Fitness Boxing comes with charts that determines estimated fitness age and calorie burn based on the height and weight of the player. The game will periodically request the player to update their height and weight. The routine, length and intensity of daily workouts can be adjusted by the player at any time.

The default coach is Lin, and there is a total of 5 other coaches (3 female and 2 male), each with customizable appearances. New costumes can be unlocked by performing achievements. The coaches demonstrate every maneuver involved in each exercise, making them a visual guide for maintaining rhythm. They also provide the players tips both during and outside of the exercises.

Playlist
Fitness Boxing contains a playlist of instrumental versions of popular pop songs that is played with each workout exercise.

The songs featured in the original Fitness Boxing are;
 "She Looks So Perfect" by 5 Seconds of Summer
 "Cartoon Heroes" by Aqua
 "Girlfriend" by Avril Lavigne
 "Video Killed the Radio Star" by The Buggles
 "Call Me Maybe" by Carly Rae Jepsen
 "Baby" by Justin Bieber ft. Ludacris
 "Stronger" by Kelly Clarkson
 "Bad Romance" by Lady Gaga
 "Born This Way" by Lady Gaga
 "Funkytown" by Lipps Inc.
 "Party Rock Anthem" by LMFAO
 "Moves Like Jagger" by Maroon 5 ft. Christina Aguilera
 "Sugar" by Maroon 5
 "All About That Bass" by Meghan Trainor
 "I'm In the Mood for Dancing" by The Nolans
 "Live While We're Young" by One Direction
 "Good Time" by Owl City & Carly Rae Jepsen
 "Timber" by Pitbull ft. Kesha
 "20th Century Boy" by T. Rex
 "Shut Up and Dance" by Walk the Moon

The songs featured in Fitness Boxing 2: Rhythm & Exercise are;
 "Break Free" by Ariana Grande ft. Zedd
 "Castle on the Hill" by Ed Sheeran
 "What Makes You Beautiful" by One Direction
 "Beauty and a Beat" by Justin Bieber ft. Nicki Minaj
 "Something Just Like This" by The Chainsmokers & Coldplay
 "Bang Bang" by Jessie J, Ariana Grande & Nicki Minaj
 "Birdsong" (original composition)
 "Animals" by Martin Garrix
 "Born to Be Wild" by Steppenwolf
 "So What" by P!nk
 "Sandstorm" by Darude
 "Venus" by Bananarama
 "Don't You Worry Child" by Swedish House Mafia ft. John Martin
 "Girls Just Want to Have Fun" by Cyndi Lauper 
 "Alone" by Marshmello
 "It's My Life" by Bon Jovi
 "Boogie Wonderland" by Earth, Wind & Fire
 "Can’t Hold Us" by Macklemore & Ryan Lewis
 "I’m an Albatraoz" by AronChupa
 "Hot n Cold" by Katy Perry
 "Y.M.C.A." by Village People
 "Aim High" (original composition)
 "South Nocturne" (original composition)

Development 
Fitness Boxing was first announced by Imagineer on June 14, 2018. It was developed by former Rocket Company members working for Imagineer.

In late-September 2018, Imagineer revealed the release date of Fitness Boxing for Japan and in early-October 2018, Nintendo revealed the release date of Fitness Boxing for North America and Europe as well as screenshots of game play.

In late-October 2018, Imagineer revealed the track listing for Fitness Boxing and uploaded the first game play video of Fitness Boxing to their YouTube Channel.

Release and promotion 
On November 29, 2018, a Fitness Boxing demo was released on the European Nintendo eShop for the Switch and a demo was released on the North American eShop on December 13, 2018.

Fitness Boxing was released both digitally and physically on December 20, 2018, in Japan, December 21, 2018, in Europe and Australia and January 4, 2019, in North America.

On January 15, 2019, Nintendo held a promotional event for Fitness Boxing at Nintendo New York, which included a group of women led by Instagram fitness influencer Niki Klasnic playing the game.

Related media 

On August 26, 2021, an anime television series adaptation produced by Imagineer and Story Effect was announced. This anime series is directed and written by Junpei Morita, with motion capture by SOLID CUBE and music composed by Yūsuke Shirato. It premiered on October 1, 2021, on Tokyo MX.

Reception

Fitness Boxing received "mixed or average" reviews from critics according to Metacritic with a score of 66 out of 100, based on reviews from 14 critics.

Nintendo Life gave Fitness Boxing a 8/10; calling it "no substitute for hard hours at the gym", but still recommended the game as a workout regimen for being energetic, entertaining, and cheaper than a gym membership. Nintendo World Report gave Fitness Boxing a 7.5/10; praising it for having multiple exercises for various skill levels, but criticized the limited number of musical tracks. Nintendo Wire gave Fitness Boxing a 7.0/10, praising it for having a "decent selection of punches to throw" and for allowing the user to track their progress day-to-day, but criticized the game for its "lack of variety" and for having "repetitive music and trainer dialog".

DualShockers gave Fitness Boxing a 6.5 out of 10, saying that the game "just suffers from feeling inaccurate, even more so when punches and dodges aren’t correctly registered by the Joy-Cons", but praised the game for being "perfect for those who want to lead a healthy and active lifestyle". Destructoid gave Fitness Boxing a 7/10, saying that "There could be some hard-to-ignore faults, but the experience is fun."

The Reno Gazette-Journal gave Fitness Boxing a 6 out of 10, saying that "Fitness Boxing works great as a fitness app but not so much as a game."

Sales 
From January 7, 2019, to January 13, Fitness Boxing placed 20th on Japanese sales charts, selling 3,024 physical copies during that period.

In February 2019, Fitness Boxing started experiencing shortages in Japan.

In September 2020, Imagineer announced that the game had sold over 1 million copies worldwide.

References

External links
 
 
 

2018 video games
Boxing video games
Casual games
Fitness apps
Fitness games
Imagineer games
Nintendo games
Nintendo Switch-only games
Nintendo Switch games
Video games developed in Japan
Multiplayer and single-player video games